Dennison Corners, formally called Whitmantown, is a hamlet located on NY 28 in the Town of Columbia in Herkimer County, New York, United States.

References

Hamlets in Herkimer County, New York
Hamlets in New York (state)